Wolica-Kolonia  is a village in the administrative district of Gmina Karczmiska, within Opole Lubelskie County, Lublin Voivodeship, in eastern Poland.

The village has a population of 240.

References

Wolica-Kolonia